Each winner of the 1981 Governor General's Awards for Literary Merit was selected by a panel of judges administered by the Canada Council for the Arts.

The 1981 awards were the first time that separate awards were presented for poetry and drama, which had previously competed in a single "poetry or drama" category.

English

French

References

Governor General's Awards
Governor Generals Awards, 1981
Governor